The West Javan langur (Trachypithecus mauritius) is an Old World monkey from the Colobinae subfamily.  It was formerly considered a subspecies of Trachypithecus auratus until it was elevated to a separate species by Roos and Groves.  It is listed as vulnerable by the IUCN.  Its range is restricted to the island of Java west of Jakarta. Its range is currently restricted to Ujung Kulon National Park, Muara Angke Wildlife Reserve and Muara Gembong due to industrial development, habitat fragmentation and the disconnection of protected areas. They are known to eat the leaves and fruits of Sonneratia in mangroves.

References

Trachypithecus
West Javan langur
Primates of Indonesia
Endemic fauna of Indonesia
Fauna of Java
Mammals of Indonesia
Vulnerable fauna of Asia
West Javan langur
Taxa named by Edward Griffith (zoologist)